Edrice Femi "Bam" Adebayo (born July 18, 1997) is an American professional basketball player for the Miami Heat of the National Basketball Association (NBA). He played college basketball for the Kentucky Wildcats before being selected by the Heat with the 14th overall pick in the 2017 NBA draft. He is a two-time NBA All-Star, a three time NBA All-Defensive Second Team honoree, and he helped the Heat reach the 2020 NBA Finals. He also won a gold medal on the 2020 U.S. Olympic team in Tokyo.

Early life and high school career
Adebayo was born in Newark, New Jersey to a Nigerian Yoruba father and an African-American mother. As a child, he was given the nickname "Bam Bam" by his mother when, while watching The Flintstones at age one, he flipped over a coffee table in a manner similar to the show's character Bamm-Bamm Rubble.

Adebayo moved with his mother to North Carolina when he was seven years old. He attended Northside High School in Pinetown, North Carolina where, as a junior, he averaged 32.2 points and 21 rebounds a game. During the summer, Adebayo joined his Amateur Athletic Union (AAU) team, Team Loaded North Carolina, alongside fellow five-star 2016 recruit Dennis Smith Jr. He averaged 15.0 points and 10 rebounds per game on Adidas Uprising Circuit. Later that summer Adebayo competed at the NBPA Top 100 Camp and was named MVP at the 2015 Under Armour Elite 24 game. After his junior season at Northside he transferred to High Point Christian Academy in High Point, North Carolina. In his season debut, Adebayo scored 22 points and 17 rebounds in an 81–39 win over New Garden Friends School. On December 29, he posted 26 points and 14 rebounds in a 91–63 victory over De'Aaron Fox and Cypress Lakes High School. As a senior, Adebayo averaged 18.9 points per game, 13.0 rebounds per game, 1.4 blocks per game and 1.5 assist per game, and led the Cougars to a NCISAA state championship appearance. Adebayo was named 2016 North Carolina Mr. Basketball. In January 2016, he played in the 2016 McDonald's All-American Game and Jordan Brand Classic.

Recruiting
Adebayo was rated a five-star recruit and considered one of the best high school prospects of the 2016 class. He was ranked the No. 5 overall recruit and No. 2 power forward in the 2016 high school class.

On November 17, 2015, Adebayo committed to the University of Kentucky. He joined fellow freshmen Malik Monk, De'Aaron Fox, and Wenyen Gabriel.

College career

On December 7, 2016, Adebayo recorded 16 points and 7 rebounds in an 87–67 win against Valparaiso. On February 21, 2017, Adebayo scored 22 points and 15 rebounds to defeat Missouri in a 72–62 Victory.

As the number one seed entering the SEC tournament, Kentucky would defeat Georgia in the quarterfinals and beat Alabama in the semifinals. On March 12, 2017, Adebayo grabbed nine rebounds to help the Wildcats defeat Arkansas 82–65 and win the SEC Championship. On March 17, in the first round of the NCAA tournament, Adebayo had 18 rebounds in a 79–70 victory against Northern Kentucky. In the second round of the NCAA Tournament, Adebayo recorded 10 rebounds to help Kentucky defeat Wichita State. On March 24, Kentucky defeated UCLA in the Sweet Sixteen, Adebayo had 12 rebounds in the game. On March 26, Adebayo scored 13 points and seven rebounds in a 75–73 loss in the Elite Eight against North Carolina. After the loss in the Elite Eight, he declared his entry into the 2017 NBA draft on April 5, with him signing an agent 20 days later. In 38 games for Kentucky in the 2016–17 season, Adebayo averaged 13.0 points, 8.0 rebounds, and 1.5 blocks per game and was named First-team All-SEC as well to the SEC All-Freshman team.

Professional career

Miami Heat (2017–present)

2017–2019: Early years
On June 22, 2017, Adebayo was selected with the 14th overall pick in the 2017 NBA draft by the Miami Heat. On July 1, he signed his rookie scale contract with the Heat, and joined the team for the 2017 NBA Summer League. In his rookie season, Adebayo appeared in 69 games for the Heat and averaged 6.9 points and 5.5 rebounds per game.

On November 25, 2018, Adebayo had a career-high 21 rebounds and 16 points in a 125–115 loss against the Toronto Raptors. On December 7, Adebayo recorded 22 points and 10 rebounds in a 115–98 win over the Phoenix Suns. On December 28, he scored 18 points in a 118–94 victory against the Cleveland Cavaliers. Adebayo played all 82 games, averaging 8.9 points and 7.3 rebounds per game.

2019–20: Move to starting lineup, first All-Star selection and run to the Finals
After trading Hassan Whiteside, Bam took on greater responsibilities in his first season as a starter during the 2019–20 season. On December 10, 2019, Adebayo recorded his first career triple-double with a career-high 30 points, 11 rebounds and 11 assists in a 135–121 overtime win against the Atlanta Hawks. On December 14, he had his second career triple-double in a 122–118 overtime win over the Dallas Mavericks, scoring 18 points with 11 rebounds and 10 assists. On December 16, Adebayo was named Eastern Conference Player of the Week for the games played from December 9 to 15, when he averaged 20.0 points, 11.3 rebounds, 8.7 assists per game. On January 27, he recorded 20 points, 10 rebounds and 10 assists in a 113–92 win over the Orlando Magic. On January 30, Adebayo was named to his first NBA All-Star Game. On February 15, he won the NBA All-Star Weekend Skills Challenge competition. Adebayo ended the season averaging 15.9 points, 10.2 rebounds, 5.1 assist, 1.3 blocks, and 1.1 steals. 

In the NBA Playoffs Bam helped lead the Heat to their first finals appearance since 2014 scoring a playoff career high 32 points, grabbing 14 rebounds and dishing out 5 assists in the decisive 125–113 victory over the Boston Celtics in Game 6 of the Eastern Conference Finals. After suffering an injury in game 1 of the 2020 NBA Finals the Heat would go on to lose to the Los Angeles Lakers in 6 games. At the end of the 2019–20 season, Adebayo finished as runner-up in voting for the Most Improved Player Award. He was also named to the NBA All-Defensive Second Team and finished fifth in voting for the Defensive Player of the Year Award.

2020–2022: Best Eastern Conference record and return to Conference Finals
On November 28, 2020, Adebayo signed a five-year contract extension with the Heat. On January 23, 2021, Adebayo scored career-high 41 points and delivered nine assists in a 128–124 loss against the Brooklyn Nets. On February 18, Adebayo logged his first triple-double of the season with 16 points, 12 rebounds and 10 assists in a 118–110 win over the Sacramento Kings. Teammate Jimmy Butler posted 13 points, 10 rebounds and 13 assists, making them the first pair in league history to register triple-doubles in the same game more than once. Adebayo finished the season averaging 18.7 points, 9.0 rebounds, and a career high 5.4 assists while being named to a second consecutive All-Defensive Second Team and finishing fourth in Defensive Player of the Year Voting.

On December 7, 2021, Adebayo underwent right thumb surgery and was ruled out for at least 4-to-6 weeks. Adebayo helped lead the Heat to the number 1 seed in the Eastern Conference with a 53–29 record and a return trip to the Conference Finals where they again faced off against the Boston Celtics. On May 21, 2022, in Game 3 of the Eastern Conference Finals, Adebayo recorded 31 points on 15-of-22 shooting from the field along with 10 rebounds, 6 assists and 4 steals in a 109–103 win over the Boston Celtics. On May 29, in the decisive Game 7, the Heat were eliminated despite 25 points, 11 rebounds and four assists from Adebayo. At the end of the season Adebayo was named to the All-Defensive Second Team for the third consecutive season and placed fourth in Defensive Player of the Year Voting while averaging 19.1 points, 10.1 rebounds, and 3.4 assists.

2022–23: Second All-Star appearance
On November 25, 2022, Adebayo scored a season-high 38 points and grabbed 12 rebounds in a 110–107 win over the Washington Wizards. On February 2, 2023, Adebayo was named to his second NBA All-Star Game. On February 8, Adebayo  tied his season high with 38 points on 12-of-16 shooting from the field and 14-of-14 shooting from the free throw line in a 116–111 win over the Indiana Pacers.

National team career
Adebayo was cut from the United States national team for the 2019 World Cup, but he was named to their 2020 Olympic team and won a gold medal. He had also been considering the Nigerian team for the Olympics.

Career statistics

NBA

Regular season

|-
| style="text-align:left;"|
| style="text-align:left;"|Miami
| 69 || 19 || 19.8 || .512 || .000 || .721 || 5.5 || 1.5 || .5 || .6 || 6.9
|-
| style="text-align:left;"|
| style="text-align:left;"|Miami
| style="background:#cfecec;"|82* || 28 || 23.3 || .576 || .200 || .735 || 7.3 || 2.2 || .9 || .8 || 8.9
|-
| style="text-align:left;"|
| style="text-align:left;"|Miami
| 72 || 72 || 33.6 || .557 || .143 || .691 || 10.2 || 5.1 || 1.1 || 1.3 || 15.9
|-
| style="text-align:left;"|
| style="text-align:left;"|Miami
| 64 || 64 || 33.5 || .570 || .250 || .799 || 9.0 || 5.4 || 1.2 || 1.0 || 18.7
|-
| style="text-align:left;"|
| style="text-align:left;"|Miami
| 56 || 56 || 32.6 || .557 || .000 || .753 || 10.1 || 3.4 || 1.4 || .8 || 19.1
|- class="sortbottom"
| style="text-align:center;" colspan="2"|Career
| 343 || 239 || 28.2 || .558 || .140 || .741 || 8.3 || 3.5 || 1.0 || .9 || 13.5
|- class="sortbottom"
| style="text-align:center;" colspan="2"|All-Star
| 2 || 0 || 17.6 || .857 || – || – || 2.0 || 1.0 || .0 || .0 || 6.0

Playoffs

|-
| style="text-align:left;"|2018
| style="text-align:left;"|Miami
| 5 || 0 || 15.4 || .467 || .000 || .214 || 4.0 || .0 || .0 || .4 || 3.4
|-
| style="text-align:left;"|2020
| style="text-align:left;"|Miami
| 19 || 19 || 36.2 || .564 || .000 || .783 || 10.3 || 4.4 || 1.0 || .8 || 17.8
|-
| style="text-align:left;"|2021
| style="text-align:left;"|Miami
| 4 || 4 || 34.0 || .456 ||  || .769 || 9.3 || 4.3 || 1.3 || .5 || 15.5
|-
| style="text-align:left;"|2022
| style="text-align:left;"|Miami
| 18 || 18 || 34.1 || .594 || .000 || .763 || 8.0 || 2.7 || 1.0 || .7 || 14.8
|- class="sortbottom"
| style="text-align:center;" colspan="2"|Career
| 46 || 41 || 32.9 || .559 || .000 || .739 || 8.6 || 3.2 || .9 || .7 || 14.8

College

|-
| style="text-align:left;"|2016–17
| style="text-align:left;"|Kentucky
| 38 || 38 || 30.1 || .599 ||  || .653 || 8.0 || .8 || .7 || 1.5 || 13.0

References

External links

 Kentucky Wildcats bio
 USA Basketball bio

1997 births
Living people
21st-century African-American sportspeople
African-American basketball players
American men's basketball players
American people of Yoruba descent
American sportspeople of Nigerian descent
Basketball players at the 2020 Summer Olympics
Basketball players from North Carolina
Centers (basketball)
Kentucky Wildcats men's basketball players
McDonald's High School All-Americans
Medalists at the 2020 Summer Olympics
Miami Heat draft picks
Miami Heat players
National Basketball Association All-Stars
Olympic gold medalists for the United States in basketball
People from Beaufort County, North Carolina
Power forwards (basketball)
United States men's national basketball team players